Klenová is a municipality and village in Klatovy District in the Plzeň Region of the Czech Republic. It has about 100 inhabitants.

Sights
Klenová is known for the Klenová Castle.

Notable people
Kryštof Harant (1564–1621), nobleman and traveller

Gallery

References

Villages in Klatovy District